The fourth annual Altazor Awards took place on March 24, 2003, at the Centro Cultural Matucana 100.

Nominations
Winners are in bold text.

Literary Arts

Narrative 
 Pía Barros  – Los que sobran
 Jaime Collyer  – El habitante del Cielo
 Alejandra Costamagna  – Cansado ya del sol 
 Hernán Rivera Letelier  – Santa María de las flores negras

Poetry 
 Claudio Bertoni  – Jóvenes Buenas Mozas
 Óscar Hahn  – Apariciones profanas
 Gonzalo Millán  – Claroscuro
 Manuel Silva Acevedo  – Día Quinto

Essay 
 Rafael Gumucio  – Monstruos Cardinales
 Bernardo Subercaseaux  – Nación y Cultura en América Latina
 Armando Uribe  – Memorias para Cecilia
 Fernando Villagrán  – Disparen a la bandada

Visual Arts

Painting 
 Gracia Barrios  – Taller por Taller
 Pablo Domínguez  – Oleos
 Matilde Pérez  – Antes, hoy, siempre
 Ricardo Yrarrázaval  – Retrospectiva: 50 años

Sculpture 
 Marcela Correa  – Natural Sintético
 Patricia Del Canto  – In Illud Tempus
 Cristián Salineros  – Estructura natural

Engraving and Drawing 
 Florencia De Amesti  – Collages y Dibujos
 Eduardo Garreaud  – Fin de Partida II
 Guillermo Núñez  – Tiro al Blanco
 Natasha Pons  – Cuerpo Ausente

Installation art and Video art 
 Gonzalo Díaz  – Tratado del Entendimiento Humano
 Sebastián Preece  – Intervenciones de utilidad pública
 Lotty Rosenfeld  – Moción de Orden
 Alicia Villarreal  – Ejercicio de copia

Photography 
 Jorge Aceituno  – Con Agua de Cielo
 Juan Domingo Marinello  – Fotodigrafías de Identidad
 Mariana Matthews  – Ojo de Agua
 Leonora Vicuña  – Bares y garzones: un homenaje visual

Performing Arts Theatre

Dramaturgy 
 Marco Antonio De la Parra  – Las Costureras
 Ana María Harcha and Francisca Bernardi  – Kinder
 Gustavo Meza  – El Submarino Amarillo
 Juan Radrigán  – Huidobro: Digo siempre adiós y me quedo

Director 
 Alfredo Castro  – Devastados (Blasted)
 Gustavo Meza  – El Submarino Amarillo
 Alejandro Trejo  – Sor María Ignacio lo explica todo para usted
 Jaime Vadell  – Comida con amigos

Actor 
 Luis Gnecco  – Devastados (Blasted)
 Felipe Ríos  – Esperando a Godot
 José Secall  – Devuélveme el rosario de mi madre y quédate con todo lo de Marx
 Pedro Vicuña  – Titus Andrónicus

Actress 
 Heidrun Breier  – Sor María Ignacio lo explica todo para usted
 María Izquierdo  – El Derrumbe
 Amparo Noguera  – Cartas Vencidas
 Paulina Urrutia  – Devastados (Blasted)

Performing Arts Dance

Choreography 
 Luis Eduardo Araneda  – Cortometraje
 Gigi Caciuleanu  – Cuerpos
 Valentina Pavez and Francisca Labbé  – Mirror
 Francisca Sazié  – Tercera Persona (Intruso)

Male Dancer 
 Mauricio Barahona  – Foto- Danza
 César Morales  – Romeo y Julieta
 César Sepúlveda  – Cuerpos
 Miguel Angel Serrano  – Rosalinda

Female Dancer 
 Natalia Berríos  – Romeo y Julieta
 Paola Moret  – Cuerpos
 Kana Nakao  – Cortometraje
 Paula Sacur  – Pichanga

Musical Arts

Classical music 
 Pablo Délano  – Cantata Navidad en Chile
 Ensamble Contemporáneo  – Pierrot-Lunaire
 Ensamble Serenata  – Puertas
 Silvia Sandoval Salas  – Dirección Coro "Arsis XXI", recitantes y conjunto Instrumental. "Cantata Navidad en Chile"

Traditional music 
 Nano Acevedo  – Será la uva en abril que vendrá
 Eduardo Parra. Tío Lalo  – 80 son las razones
 Mario Rojas & Grupo with Los Santiaguinos  – Folklore Urbano
 Quelentaro  – 8 de marzo

Ballad 
 Eduardo Gatti  – Númina
 Daniel Guerrero  – Mañana
 Tati Penna  – Tangos
 Alexis Venegas  – Cierto día, Cierta Noche

Pop/Rock 
 Chancho en Piedra  – El Tinto Elemento
 Los Bunkers  – Canción de Lejos
 Los Tetas  – Tómala!
 Matahari  – Deja el cuerpo

Alternative/Jazz 
 Claudia Acuña  – Rhythm of life
 Alfredo Espinoza  – Jam Session en el Club de Jazz
 Emilio García  – Ultrablues
 Mariela González  – En Privado

Playing 
 Edward Brown (English horn)
 Manuel Jiménez (Harp)
 Celso López (Cello)

Media Arts Film

Director Fiction 
 Nicolás Acuña  – Paraíso B
 Joaquín Eyzaguirre  – Tres Noches de un Sábado
 Jorge Olguín  – Sangre Eterna
 Alejandro Rojas  – Ogú y Mampato en Rapa Nui

Director Documentary 
 Patricio Guzmán  – Madrid
 Paula Rodríguez  – Volver a vernos
 Marcela Said  – I Love Pinochet
 Iván Tziboulka  – Gitanos sin carpa

Actor 
 Rodolfo Bravo  – El Fotógrafo
 Luis Dubó  – Negocio Redondo
 Juan Pablo Ogalde  – Paraíso B
 Nelson Villagra  – Paraíso B

Actress 
 Paulina García  – Tres Noches de un Sábado
 Carmen Disa Gutiérrez  – Negocio Redondo
 Tichi Lobos  – Tres Noches de un Sábado
 Paola Volpato  – Tres Noches de un Sábado

Media Arts TV

Director Drama 
 Herbal Abreu  – Más que amigos
 Marcelo Ferrari  – El Pozo (Ciclo Cuentos Chilenos)
 María Eugenia Rencoret  – Purasangre
 Vicente Sabatini  – El Circo de las Montini

Director TV Show 
 Francisco Gedda, Manuel Gedda, Juan Carlos Gedda, Ricardo Carrasco, Pedro Chaskel and María de los Angeles Nuño  – Al Sur del Mundo
 Cristian Leighton  – Los Inmigrantes
 Sebastián Lía  – Ciento
 Patricia Mora  – Viaje al Centro de la Música

Screenplay 
 Néstor Castagno  – Más que amigos
 Larisa Contreras, Alejandro Cabrera, Arnaldo Madrid, René Arcos, Daniella Lillo and Marcelo Leonart  – Purasangre
 Carolina Díaz and Cristián Leighton  – Los Inmigrantes
 Luis Ponce  – Salado y Confitado (La Vida es una Lotería)

Actor 
 Néstor Cantillana  – El Circo de las Montini
 Francisco Pérez-Bannen  – Purasangre
 Mauricio Pesutic  – Purasangre
 José Soza  – El Circo de las Montini

Actress 
 Carolina Arregui  – Buen Partido
 Paola Giannini  – Purasangre
 Delfina Guzmán  – El Circo de las Montini
 Gloria Münchmeyer  – Purasangre

References

Chilean awards